Yunmen Temple, may refer to:

 Yunmen Temple (Guangdong), in Shaoguan, Guangdong, China
 Yunmen Temple (Hunan), in Xiangxiang, Hunan, China
 Yunmen Temple (Fujian), in Changle, Fujian, China